The Antigua and Barbuda Defence Force Coast Guard is the maritime branch of the Antigua and Barbuda Defence Force. The purpose of the coast guard is to maintain the countries interests, and along with the Antigua and Barbuda Defence Force Air Wing, patrol the waters of the country.

The Coast Guard has additional responsibilities, including search and rescue, oil pollution response, ship safety inspections, and broadcasting of maritime safety alerts.

History 
The Coast Guard was originally founded as the Antigua and Barbuda Police Marine Unit, however, on 1 May 1995, it was absorbed into the Antigua and Barbuda Defence Force, and became known as the Antigua and Barbuda Coast Guard.

References

Coat Guard
Military units and formations established in 1995